Sowin may refer to the following villages in Poland:
Sowin, Lublin Voivodeship (east Poland)
Sowin, Opole Voivodeship (south-west Poland)
Sowin, Łódź Voivodeship (central Poland)